Kill the Vultures is an American hip hop group from Minneapolis, Minnesota. It consists of rapper Crescent Moon and producer Anatomy. It was chosen by City Pages as the Best Hip-Hop Artist in 2005.

History
Kill the Vultures was formed by Oddjobs' former members Crescent Moon, Anatomy, Advizer, and Nomi.

In 2006, the group (now minus Nomi and Advizer) released the album The Careless Flame.

In 2015, the group released Carnelian, on Totally Gross National Product.

Members

Current
Crescent Moon (Alexei Casselle) - rapper
Anatomy (Stephen Lewis) - producer/DJ

Former
Advizer (Adam Waytz) - rapper
Nomi (Mario Demira) - rapper

Discography

Studio albums
Kill the Vultures (2005)
The Careless Flame (2006)
Ecce Beast (2009)
Carnelian (2015)

EPs
Midnight Pine (2007)

Singles
"Moonshine" (2006)
"The Jackal" (2015)

References

External links

American hip hop groups
American musical duos
Musical groups from Minnesota
Midwest hip hop groups
Alternative hip hop groups
Locust Music artists